Chiksana railway station (station code CIK) is a railway station located in Chak Baltikari, the Indian state of Rajasthan.

Major trains
Five trains stop at Chiksana railway station.

 BKI–BARELLY PASSENGER
 BE/BKI PASS
 IDH–BKI DMU
 BTE–KSJ PASSENGER
 BKI–IDH SHUTTLE

See also

 North Western Railway zone
 Western Railway zone

References 

Rail transport in Rajasthan